Ronald Eric Bean (10 April 1926 – 7 July 1992) was an English professional footballer of the 1950s. Born in Crayford, he joined Gravesend & Northfleet in January 1951 from Blyth Spartans. After 14 appearances in the Southern Football League he was signed by professional club Gillingham in June of the same year, primarily to serve as back-up goalkeeper to Tommy Rigg. He made three appearances for the first team in December 1951, but Gillingham lost all three games and he was not selected again. At the end of the 1951–52 season he was released from his contract. No further details of his career are known.

References

1926 births
1992 deaths
English footballers
Gillingham F.C. players
Blyth Spartans A.F.C. players
Ebbsfleet United F.C. players
Association football goalkeepers